Vizella is a genus of leaf-inhabiting fungi in the class Dothideomycetes, and the type genus of the family Vizellaceae. The genus was circumscribed by Pier Andrea Saccardo in 1883.

Species
Vizella amazonica M.L.Farr 1987
Vizella appendiculosa (Mont. & Berk.) Theiss. 1914
Vizella banksiae H.J.Swart 1971
Vizella bingervilliana C.Moreau & M.Moreau 1951
Vizella conferta (Cooke) Sacc. 1883
Vizella crescentiae Bat. & J.L.Bezerra 1960
Vizella discontinua Selkirk 1972
Vizella gomphispora (Berk. & Broome) S.Hughes 1953
Vizella grandis Speg. 1922
Vizella grevilleae H.J.Swart 1975
Vizella guaranitica Speg. 1888
Vizella guilielmi Rehm 1911
Vizella gustaviae Bat. & I.H.Lima 1957
Vizella hendrickxii (Hansf.) S.Hughes 1953
Vizella hieronymi G.Winter 1885
Vizella memorabilis (Dilcher) Selkirk 1972
Vizella metrosideri P.R.Johnst. 2000
Vizella oleariae H.J.Swart 1971
Vizella passiflorae Rehm 1913
Vizella philothecae Cunningt. 2005
Vizella pogonophorae Bat. & Cif. 1957
Vizella psychotriae Bat. & Peres 1960
Vizella pycnanthi Sivan. 1973
Vizella royenae (Doidge) Arx & E.Müll. 1954
Vizella splendida Bat. & J.L.Bezerra 1960
Vizella tunicata Gadgil 1995
Vizella urvilleana Speg. 1909
Vizella vochysiacearum (Bat., J.L.Bezerra & Cavalc.) J.K.Liu, R.Phookamsak & K.D.Hyde 2013 
Vizella xanthorrhoeae Sivan. & B.Sutton 1985

References

External links

Dothideomycetes genera
Taxa named by Pier Andrea Saccardo
Taxa described in 1883